The 1987–88 Scottish Second Division was won by Ayr United who, along with second placed St Johnstone, were promoted to the First Division. Stranraer finished bottom.

Table

Promoted: Ayr United, St. Johnstone

References

Scottish Second Division seasons
3
Scot